Chris Grace (born 29 December 1946), MBE, is a British broadcaster, film director and founder and former CEO of The Shakespeare Schools Festival. In 2000 he was awarded an MBE and a BAFTA special for services to screen animation.

Career
Grace joined Harlech / HTV as a programme scheduler in 1969, becoming Head of Programme Planning in 1973. He helped co-found S4C/ Channel Four Wales in 1981, with responsibility for scheduling the bi-lingual channel. He was made a Bard at the 1983 National Eisteddfod in recognition of his contribution to S4C and the Welsh language. He kickstarted the Welsh animation industry with commissions of SuperTed, Wil Cwac Cwac, Sam Tan/Fireman Sam and The Legend of Lochnagar which featured the Prince of Wales. These sold widely through S4C International of which Grace was CEO.  After the fall of the Berlin Wall, he pioneered Russian – Welsh co-productions, featuring abridged works of Shakespeare, Opera, Chaucer and the Bible. Over the ’90s this relationship was broadened to 20 other countries, with films going on to win several BAFTA and Emmy awards as well as two Academy Award nominations. The Russian – Welsh animated feature film The Miracle Maker, on the life of Jesus, was unique in being shown coast-to-coast in the US on ABC television over successive Easters.

After his resignation, he has been involved with the third sector. In 2000, Grace founded The Shakespeare Schools Festival (SSF) evolving from his 12 part Animated Shakespeare series. SSF schools have performed many times in Nos 10 & 11 Downing St as well as in both Houses of Parliament and many West End theatres. He stepped aside from being founding CEO in 2016.

Grace currently advises Eastside, an ACE backed arts-education charity, is a Business Advisor for Young Enterprise, and a Governor of Woolmore Primary School in Tower Hamlets.

With Penelope Middleboe and Donald Fry he co-wrote We Shall Never Surrender, a compendium of diaries from World War 2 published by Macmillan

References 

Living people
1946 births
21st-century British writers
Members of the Order of the British Empire
British animated film producers